Mumbai Can Dance Saala is a 2015 Bollywood film written and directed by Sachindra Sharma. The film stars Ashima Sharma, Aditya Pancholi, Shakti Kapoor and Rakhi Sawant in lead roles. Upon release, the film received negative reviews.

Cast
 Ashima Sharma
 Prashant Narayanan as Saala
 Aditya Pancholi
 Shakti Kapoor
 Rakhi Sawant
 Rahul Sood
 Kiran Janjani
 Pankaj Berry
 Pradeep Aggarwal
 Manoj Maru
 Mukesh Tiwari
 Anil Chauhan
 vikas sexena'

Soundtrack
 "De Di Permission" - Ritu Pathak & Vinod Rathod
 "Mahiya" -  Alka Yagnik & Shaan
 "Mumbai Can Dance Saalaa" - Sunidhi Chauhan
 "Salame Salame" - Bappi Lahiri
 "Shake My Kamariya" - Mamta Sharma
 "Maula Maula" - Goldie Sohel

Critical reception
Renuka Vyavahare from The Times of India gave it 0.5 stars, writing ″The film is so excruciatingly boring that it might change the opinion of those who were against the shutting down of dance bars.″ Mumbai Mirror critic Rahul Desai gave it 0.5 stars and wrote ″Bar dancer Tarannum Khan financed C-grade movies at her prime, only to have an F-grade film "loosely based" on her made a decade later and movie has no class atol beside the controversy which took place in movie launching when director of the movie(Sachindra Sharma) was slapped by one of the female artist, who claimed to be Rakhi sawant's friend. She did a cheap publicity stunt.

References

External links 
 

2015 films
2010s Hindi-language films
Films scored by Bappi Lahiri